Michael Lee Fetters (born December 19, 1964) is an American professional baseball coach. He is currently the bullpen coach for the Arizona Diamondbacks of Major League Baseball (MLB). Fetters started his playing career with the California Angels and also played for the Milwaukee Brewers, Oakland Athletics, Baltimore Orioles, Los Angeles Dodgers, Pittsburgh Pirates, the Diamondbacks, and Minnesota Twins. Fetters had his best season in  when he finished fifth in the American League in saves with 32 with the Brewers. Fetters finished his career with 100 career saves.

Career
Fetters is a graduate of Iolani School,  where he played high school baseball in the early 1980s, in Honolulu, Hawaii.

Fetters played baseball at Pepperdine University and was drafted in the first round of the 1986 Major League Draft by the California Angels. Fetters is known for his head movement while on the mound. Prior to a pitch, he took a deep breath and moved his head quickly 90 degrees to the left. He explained that being stressed during pitching was the reason for his head movement. In , teammate Mark Grace comically imitated the Fetters move when invited to pitch one Diamondbacks inning. During one game in the 2004 season, Houston Astro Craig Biggio imitated Fetters' head movement and scowl while batting against him, drawing laughter from the Houston crowd. Fetters is a cousin of American baritone Stephen Totter.   he works as the Arizona Diamondbacks bullpen coach after four years as a quality control coach.

Personal life
Fetters is of mixed ethnicity, being half-Caucasian and half-Samoan in ancestry.

References

External links

1964 births
Living people
American expatriate baseball players in Canada
American people of Samoan descent
American sports agents
Arizona Diamondbacks coaches
Arizona Diamondbacks players
Baltimore Orioles players
Baseball coaches from California
Baseball players from California
California Angels players
Edmonton Trappers players
ʻIolani School alumni
Los Angeles Dodgers players
Major League Baseball bullpen coaches
Major League Baseball pitchers
Midland Angels players
Milwaukee Brewers players
Minnesota Twins players
Oakland Athletics players
Palm Springs Angels players
People from Van Nuys, Los Angeles
Pepperdine Waves baseball players
Pittsburgh Pirates players
Rochester Red Wings players
Salem Angels players
Tucson Sidewinders players
Tucson Toros players